The  is a commuter electric multiple unit (EMU) train that the private railway operator Odakyu Electric Railway has operated in the Tokyo area of Japan since March 1995.

Nine 8-car sets in total were manufactured between 1995 and 2001 in three batches.

Formation
, the fleet consisted of nine 8-car sets, 2051 to 2059, formed as follows with four motored (M) cars and four unpowered trailer (T) cars. Car 8 is at the Shinjuku end.

 Cars 2, 3, and 6, are each equipped with one single-arm pantograph.
 Cars 2, 3, 6, and 7 have wider (1,600 mm) doorways.
 The end cars, 1 and 8, have a wheelchair space.
 Car 2 is designated as a mildly-air-conditioned car.

History
The trains were delivered between January 1995 and April 2001, with the first trains entering revenue service on 8 March 1995. These sets are primarily used for Local services.

Build details
The build histories for the fleet are as follows.

In popular culture
The Odakyu 2000 series is featured as a player-driveable train in the Microsoft Train Simulator computer game.

References

External links

 Nippon Sharyo information page
 

Electric multiple units of Japan
02000 series
Train-related introductions in 1995
1500 V DC multiple units of Japan
Nippon Sharyo multiple units
Kawasaki multiple units
Tokyu Car multiple units